

Events

March events 
 March 4 – Gridley Bryant's Granite Railway is incorporated.

April events
 April 1 – Construction begins in Massachusetts on the Granite Railway, one of the first railroads in North America, under the direction of Gridley Bryant.
 April 17 – The Mohawk and Hudson Railroad is chartered to build a railroad between Albany and Schenectady, the first in New York State.

May events
 May 5 – Liverpool and Manchester Railway, designed by George Stephenson and Joseph Locke, and which in 1830 is to become the world's first purpose built passenger railway operated by steam locomotives to be opened, is authorised by the Parliament of the United Kingdom.
 May 26 – Edinburgh and Dalkeith Railway in Scotland is authorised by the Parliament of the United Kingdom.

October events
 October 1 – Opening of the Monkland and Kirkintilloch Railway in Scotland.
 October 7 – The first train operates over the Granite Railway in Massachusetts.

Births

January births
 January 2 – Algernon S. Buford, president of the Richmond and Danville Railroad (d. 1911).

March births
 March 4 – Theodore Judah, American engineer who argued the case for construction of the First transcontinental railroad (d. 1863).

April births 
 April 3 – Cyrus K. Holliday, cofounder of Topeka, Kansas, and first president of the Atchison, Topeka and Santa Fe Railroad (d. 1900).

November births
November 10 – Oden Bowie, the 34th Governor of the State of Maryland in the United States from 1869 to 1872, founder and first President of the Baltimore and Potomac Railroad and also president of the Baltimore City Passenger Railway.

December births
 December 1 – William Mahone, American civil engineer and Confederate Army Major General who built the Norfolk and Petersburg Railroad, a predecessor of the Norfolk and Western (d. 1895).

Unknown date births
 John P. Laird, Scottish engineer, designer and patentee of the two-wheel equalized leading truck for steam locomotives (d. 1882).

Deaths

February deaths
 February 20 – Matthew Murray, English steam engine manufacturer (b. 1765).

References